The 2002–03 Meistriliiga season was the 13th season of the Meistriliiga, the top level of ice hockey in Estonia. Eight teams participated in the league, and Tartu Valk 494 won the championship.

Regular season

Group A

Group B

Playoffs

Quarterfinals 
 HK Stars Tallinn - Kohtla-Järve ChC 4:6
 HK Karud-Monstera Tallinn - HC Panter Tallinn 2:3

Semifinals 
 Tartu Välk 494 - Kohtla-Järve ChC 4:0
 HK Narva 2000 - HC Panter Tallinn 4:3 n.V.

3rd place 
 Kohtla-Järve ChC - HC Panter Tallinn 1:3

Final 
 Tartu Välk 494 - HK Narva 2000 4:1

External links
Season on hockeyarchives.info

Meistriliiga
Meist
Meistriliiga (ice hockey) seasons